Finlandia is a 1922 Finnish documentary and propaganda film.

Production
Finlandia was a major early Finnish documentary. Both it and another film,  (1911), were made to market Finland abroad. Before independence of Finland, most of the film production consisted of non-feature films. Finlandia was directed Erkki Karu and Eero Leväluoma. It was commissioned by the Foreign Ministry of Finland.

Content
The film is 95 minutes long and it is divided in six acts. It is a government-produced propaganda film that introduces the nature, sports, military, agriculture and capital of Finland.

Impact
The film achieved some success abroad. It was screened in around 40 countries. Versions were made in various languages.

Reconstructions
The original version of the film has been lost. However, it has since then been reconstructed.

See also
Cinema of Finland
List of Finnish films of 1917–39

References

External links
Finlandia (1922) at Elonet 

1922 films
Lost Finnish films
Finnish black-and-white films
Finnish documentary films
1922 documentary films